John Halahan  was a long serving Irish Anglican priest: most notably Dean of Ross from 1905 to 1919.

Halahan was born in Dublin and educated at Trinity College, Dublin He was ordained deacon in 1846 and priest in 1847. He spent his whole career at Berehaven.

References

Alumni of Trinity College Dublin
Deans of Ross, Ireland
Christian clergy from Dublin (city)
19th-century Irish Anglican priests
20th-century Irish Anglican priests